Alloperla acadiana, the Brunswick sallfly, is a species of stonefly in the family Chloroperlidae and genus Alloperla occurring in freshwater, possibly endemic to New Brunswick. It is only known from a single male specimen taken at Pokiok, New Brunswick in 1983.

References

Plecoptera
Endemic fauna of Canada

Species known from a single specimen